Mervia is a genus of moths of the family Noctuidae.

Species
 Mervia kuznetzovi Daricheva, 1961

References
Natural History Museum Lepidoptera genus database
Mervia at funet

Cuculliinae